Champions League 2012 may refer to:
 2012 AFC Champions League
 2012 CAF Champions League
 2011–12 UEFA Champions League
 2012–13 UEFA Champions League
 2011–12 CONCACAF Champions League
 2012–13 CONCACAF Champions League
 2012 Champions League Twenty20